Oscar Ortiz may refer to:

 Oscar Alberto Ortiz (born 1953), Argentine football player
 Óscar Ortiz (Salvadoran politician) (born 1961)
 Óscar Ortiz (tennis) (born 1973), Mexican tennis player
 Oscar Ortiz (Bolivian politician) (born 1969), Bolivian politician